Highway 53 (AR 53, Ark. 53, and Hwy. 53) is a designation for two north–south state highways in Southwest Arkansas, United States. One route of  begins at the Louisiana state line and runs north to US Highway 371 (US 371) south of Prescott. A second route of  begins at Highway 24 and runs north through Gurdon to Highway 8. Both routes are maintained by the Arkansas State Highway and Transportation Department (AHTD).

Route description

Louisiana to US 371

Highway 24 to Highway 8

History
Highway 53 was created during the 1926 Arkansas state highway numbering as a route between State Road 24 in eastern Nevada County and Gurdon. The route was extended from Gurdon north to Holly Grove on July 10, 1957, adding . Six years later, Highway 53 was extended from Holly Grove north to Hollywood, creating a new overlap with Highway 51, on April 24, 1963. The highway was extended north for the last time from Hollywood to Highway 8 on June 23, 1965.

Between September 1929 and March 1930, a second segment between and Bodcaw and State Road 19 (now US 371) was added to the state highway system. The route was extended south from Bodcaw to Falcon on July 10, 1957, and extended south to US 82 at Buckner on April 24, 1963. A third section of Highway 53 was created in Lafayette County between the Louisiana state line and McKamie on March 7, 1961. The gap between the two southern routes was closed two years later when Highway 53 was extended north from McKamie to US 82 Truck in Stamps on June 23, 1965.

Major intersections

See also

Notes

References

External links

053
Transportation in Clark County, Arkansas
Transportation in Lafayette County, Arkansas
Transportation in Nevada County, Arkansas